Sigma Delta Kappa is a Professional Fraternity in the field of Law. It was founded in 1914 at the University of Michigan Law School.

History
Sigma Delta Kappa was founded as a Men's Professional Fraternity for Law on August 14, 1914.

The founders were: 

It joined the Professional Interfraternity Conference in 1933, and was a chartering organization of the Professional Fraternity Association.

Chapters
The chapters of Sigma Delta Kappa as of the printing of Baird's manual in 1977 (reprinted in the 1991 ed.) were as follows.  Active chapters at that time noted in bold, inactive chapters noted in italics:

1914 Alpha, Michigan 
1914 Beta, Chicago Law (school discontinued) 
1915 Gamma, Indiana (Indianapolis) 
1915 Delta, Hamilton Law (Chicago) 
1915 Epsilon, Benton Law, St. Louis 
1916 Zeta, Valparaiso
1917 Eta, University of Indianapolis 
1917 Theta, Chattanooga College of Law 
1920 Iota, Washington and Lee University (1926)
1921 Kappa, Atlanta Law School
1921 Lambda, Detroit College of Law, University of Detroit 
1921 Mu, National University (DC)
1921 Nu, Northwestern University 
1922 Xi, University of Georgia 
1922 Omicron, Ohio Northern 
1922 Pi, Cumberland (moved to Birmingham, Ala., 1962)
1925 Rho, San Francisco 
1925 Sigma, Southern California
1926 Chi, Alabama
1926 Phi, Hastings Law
1926 Tau, DePaul
1926 Upsilon, Minnesota Law, Minneapolis
1927 Alpha Alpha, Illinois
1927 Alpha Beta, Westminster Law (CO)
1927 Alpha Gamma, Mississippi
1927 Omega, Chicago-Kent Law (school discontinued)
1927 Psi, St. Joseph Law (MO)
1928 Alpha Delta, St. John's Law
1928 Alpha Epsilon, Louisville
1928 Alpha Eta, Knoxville Law
1928 Alpha Theta, Tennessee
1928 Alpha Zeta, John R. Neal Law, Knoxville (school discontinued)
1929 Alpha Iota, Baltimore University
1929 Alpha Kappa, Lake Erie Law (school discontinued)
1929 Alpha Lambda, Wake Forest
1929 Alpha Mu, Columbus (DC)
1929 Alpha Nu, Des Moines
1930 Alpha Xi, Los Angeles Law
1931 Alpha Omicron, Jefferson Law, Dallas
1932 Alpha Pi, Indiana
1933 Alpha Rho, Washington Law (DC)
1933 Alpha Sigma, Jones Law (AL)
1933 Alpha Tau, Woodrow Wilson (GA)
1936 Alpha Phi, Birmingham Law
1937 Alpha Psi, Philadelphia
1938 Alpha Chi, John Marshall Law, Atlanta
1951 Alpha Omega, Jackson Law (MS)
1953 Beta Alpha, Augusta Law
1960 Beta Beta, Baltimore Law
1963 Pi, Samford
1966 Unnamed?, Massey Law (GA)
1966 Beta Chi, Memphis State

Publications
Publications included the Si-De-Ka and a newsletter.

See also 
 Order of the Coif (honor society, law)
 The Order of Barristers (honor society, law; litigation)
 Phi Delta Phi (honor society, law; was a professional fraternity)
 Alpha Phi Sigma (honor society, criminal justice)
 Lambda Epsilon Chi (honor society, paralegal)

 Delta Theta Phi (professional fraternity, law)
 Gamma Eta Gamma (professional fraternity, law)
 Phi Alpha Delta (professional fraternity, law)
 Phi Beta Gamma (professional fraternity, law)
 Phi Delta Delta (professional fraternity, women, law)
 Kappa Alpha Pi (professional) (professional fraternity, pre-law)

 Kappa Beta Pi (originally women's professional fraternity, now legal association, law)
 Nu Beta Epsilon (Jewish, originally men's professional fraternity, law, dormant?)

References

Fraternities and sororities in the United States
Former members of Professional Fraternity Association
Student organizations established in 1914
1914 establishments in Michigan